is a Japanese drum and bass duo formed by Akira Jimbo and Tetsuo Sakurai in 1990, after they left the jazz/fusion band Casiopea. They released 10 albums and one "Best of" collection, and disbanded in 1998.

In 2020, they regrouped for their 30th anniversary, and in 2021 recorded a new album.

Discography

Albums
 Jimsaku (1990)
 45°C (1991)
 Jade (1992)
 Viva! (live album) (1992)
 100% (1993)
 Wind Loves Us (1993)
 Navel (1994)
 Blaze of Passion (1995)
 Dispensation (1996)
 Mega db (1997)
 Jimsaku Beyond (2021)

Compilations
 Best Selection (1995)

External links 
 Official Tetsuo Sakurai website 
 Official Akira Jimbo website 
 Twitter page of the anniversary project 

Japanese rock music groups
Japanese jazz ensembles
Jazz fusion ensembles
Drum and bass music groups
Musical groups established in 1990
Musical groups disestablished in 1998
1990 establishments in Japan
1998 disestablishments in Japan
Japanese musical duos